Capys meruensis, the Meru protea butterfly, is a butterfly in the family Lycaenidae. It is found on Mount Kenya in Kenya. The habitat consists of montane grassland at altitudes of about 2,300 meters.

The larvae feed on Protea gaguedi.

References

Butterflies described in 1988
Capys (butterfly)